Ruth White may refer to:
Ruth White (actress) (1914–1969), American actress
Ruth White (Baháʼí author) (born 1867), Baha'i and author of works relating to the Baha'i faith
Ruth White (children's author) (1942–2017), American author of works relating to life in Virginia
Ruth White (composer) (1925–2013), American composer known for electronic music
Ruth White (fencer) (born 1951), American Olympic fencer